The 2001 All-Ireland Senior Club Camogie Championship for the leading clubs in the women's team field sport of camogie was won by Pearses of Galway, who defeated Cashel of Tipperary in the final, played at Cashel .

Arrangements
The championship was organised on the traditional provincial system used in Gaelic Games since the 1880s, with Keady Lámh Dhearg and St Ibar’s winning the championships of the other two provinces.

The Final
It was one of the most dramatic finals in club championship history, Clare Grogan  scored an injury time equaliser for Cashel, followed by Carmel Hannon’s dramatic injury time winning point, and Patricia Burke’s goal line clearance.

Final stages

References

External links
 Camogie Association

2001 in camogie
2001